The Lauberhorn is a mountain in the Bernese Alps of Switzerland, located between Wengen and Grindelwald, north of the Kleine Scheidegg.

Lauberhorn ski races 

The mountain is best known for the Lauberhorn World Cup alpine ski races, held annually in mid-January above Wengen. The downhill course is currently (as of 2016) the longest in the world; its length of  results in run times of two and a half minutes.

The Lauberhorn ski races (downhill, slalom, and combined) are among the highest-attended winter sports events in the world, attracting around 30,000 spectators each year.

Races are held on two famous courses "Lauberhorn" (downhill) and "Männlichen" (slalom).

See also
 List of mountains of Switzerland accessible by public transport
 Swiss Alps

Notes and references

External links

 Lauberhorn.ch -  - official site
 Lauberhorn.ch -  - official site

Bernese Oberland
Mountains of the Alps
Mountains of the canton of Bern
Mountains of Switzerland
Two-thousanders of Switzerland